Janq'u Uma (Aymara janq'u white, uma water, "white water", also spelled Ccancouma, Janjouma) is a mountain in the north of the Apolobamba mountain range in the Andes of Peru, about  high. It is located in the Puno Region, Sandia Province, Cuyocuyo District. Janq'u Uma lies northwest of the mountain Wilaquta, northeast of Qurwari and southwest of Utkhuqaqa. Two little streams named Janq'u Uma (Janjouma) and Qullqipirwa (Jolljepirhua) originate west and east of the mountain. They flow to the river Lawa Lawani which runs to the north. It belongs to the watershed of the Inambari River.

See also 
 Liqiliqini

References 

Mountains of Puno Region
Mountains of Peru